A Peripheral Interface Adapter (PIA) is a peripheral integrated circuit providing parallel I/O interfacing for microprocessor systems.

Description
Common PIAs include the Motorola MC6820 and MC6821, and the MOS Technology MCS6520, all of which are functionally identical but have slightly different electrical characteristics.  The PIA is most commonly packaged in a 40 pin DIP package.

The PIA is designed for glueless connection to the Motorola 6800 style bus, and provides 20 I/O lines, which are organised into two 8-bit bidirectional ports (or 16 general-purpose I/O lines) and 4 control lines (for handshaking and interrupt generation). The directions for all 16 general lines (PA0-7, PB0-7) can be programmed independently. The control lines can be programmed to generate interrupts, automatically generate handshaking signals for devices on the I/O ports, or output a plain high or low signal.

In 1976 Motorola switched the MC6800 family to a depletion-mode technology to improve the manufacturing yield and to operate at a faster speed. The Peripheral Interface Adapter had a slight change in the electrical characteristics of the I/O pins so the MC6820 became the MC6821.

The MC6820 was used in the Apple I to interface the ASCII keyboard and the display.
It was also deployed in the 6800-powered first generation of Bally electronic pinball machines (1977-1985), such as Flash Gordon
and Kiss.
The MCS6520 was used in the Atari 400 and 800 and Commodore PET family of computers (for example, to provide four joystick ports to the machine).
The Tandy Color Computer uses two MC6821s to provide I/O access to the video, audio and peripherals.

References
 Leventhal, Lance A. (1986). 6502 Assembly Language Programming 2nd Edition. Osborne/McGraw-Hill. .

Input/output integrated circuits